Mala Lašna (in older sources also Mala Lašina) is a small village in the hills north of Lukovica pri Domžalah, in the eastern part of the Upper Carniola region of Slovenia.

References

External links

Mala Lašna on Geopedia

Populated places in the Municipality of Lukovica